Dooms may refer to:

 Dooms, Virginia, census-designated place in Augusta County, Virginia, United States.
 Harry Dooms (1867–1899), nicknamed "Jack", Major League Baseball outfielder
Jan Gaspar Dooms (1597–1675), Flemish draftsman and copperplate engraver active in Prague.

See also
 Doom (disambiguation)
 Doomed (disambiguation)
 Doomsday (disambiguation)